Keljin DeShawn Blevins (born November 24, 1995) is an American professional basketball player who last played for Rapid București of the Liga Națională. He played college basketball at Southern Mississippi and Montana State.

Early life and high school
Blevins was born and grew up in Hot Springs, Arkansas and initially attended Lakeside High School. He averaged 10 points and 7.3 rebounds per game and helped lead the Rams to a 5A-South conference title as a junior. Blevins transferred to Bishop O'Connell High School in Arlington County, Virginia for his senior year and was named honorable mention All-Washington Catholic Athletic Conference.

College career
Blevins began his collegiate career at Southern Mississippi. He averaged 1.8 points and 1.8 rebounds in 25 games in his freshman season. As a sophomore, Blevins averaged 5.8 points and 3.4 rebounds in 22.3 minutes over 29 games, 24 of which he started. After the season, he decided to transfer to Montana State University.

After sitting out one year due to NCAA transfer rules, Blevins entered his redshirt junior season as a starter for the Bobcats and averaged 9.7 points and 5.8 rebounds per game. In the final game of his college career on March 14, 2019, Blevins scored a career-high 27 points in a 90–84 loss to Eastern Washington. As a redshirt senior, he averaged 11.8 points and a team-high 5.9 rebounds per game.

Professional career

Northern Arizona Suns (2019–2020)
After going unselected in the 2019 NBA Draft, Blevins played on the Portland Trail Blazers Summer League team and signed a training camp contract with the team on September 30, 2019. He was waived at the end of training camp.

After being waived, Blevins was selected with the 15th overall pick in the 2019 NBA G League Draft by the Northern Arizona Suns. He averaged 4.3 points and 2.8 rebounds in 35 games in his first professional season.

Portland Trail Blazers (2020–2022)
Blevins was signed by the Trail Blazers to a two-way contract on November 25, 2020. Blevins made his NBA debut on December 23, 2020, playing four minutes while shooting 0–2 from the field with one assist in the fourth quarter of a 100–120 loss to the Utah Jazz in the Trailblazers' season opener. The appearance made him the first former Montana State player to play in an NBA game.

On September 23, 2021, Blevins signed another two-way contract with the Trail Blazers.

Rapid București (2022–2023)
In 2022, Blevins joined Rapid București of the Liga Națională, averaging 4.8 points, 3.2 rebounds, and 1.2 assists per game. He was released on March 3, 2023.

Career statistics

NBA

Regular season

|-
| style="text-align:left;"| 
| style="text-align:left;"| Portland
| 17 || 0 || 4.4 || .250 || .250 ||  || .6 || .2 || .1 || .0 || .7
|-
| style="text-align:left;"| 
| style="text-align:left;"| Portland
| 31 || 1 || 11.3 || .306 || .292 || .545 || 1.5 || .6 || .4 || .0 || 3.1
|- class="sortbottom"
| style="text-align:center;" colspan="2"| Career
| 48 || 1 || 8.8 || .298 || .288 || .545 || 1.1 || .5 || .3 || .0 || 2.2

Playoffs

|-
| style="text-align:left;"| 2021
| style="text-align:left;"| Portland
| 2 || 0 || 2.0 || .500 || .000 ||  || .0 || .0 || .0 || .0 || 1.0

Personal life
Blevins is the cousin of the Trail Blazers All-Star point guard Damian Lillard.

References

External links
Southern Miss Golden Eagles bio
Montana State Bobcats bio
NBA G League profile

1995 births
Living people
American men's basketball players
American expatriate basketball people in Romania
Basketball players from Arkansas
Montana State Bobcats men's basketball players
Northern Arizona Suns players
Portland Trail Blazers players
Small forwards
Southern Miss Golden Eagles basketball players
Sportspeople from Hot Springs, Arkansas
Undrafted National Basketball Association players